Murray Clarke Loudon  (29 October 1931 – 30 January 2019) was a New Zealand field hockey player. He represented New Zealand in field hockey between 1954 and 1956, including at the 1956 Olympic Games in Melbourne.

Loudon studied at the University of Otago, graduating with a Bachelor of Dental Surgery with commendation in 1954. In the 1991 New Year Honours, he was appointed a Member of the Order of the British Empire, for services to the dental profession and the community. He died on 30 January 2019.

References

External links

1931 births
2019 deaths
Sportspeople from Ashburton, New Zealand
New Zealand male field hockey players
Olympic field hockey players of New Zealand
Field hockey players at the 1956 Summer Olympics
University of Otago alumni
New Zealand Members of the Order of the British Empire
20th-century New Zealand people
21st-century New Zealand people